WINW (1520 kHz) is a commercial AM radio station licensed to Canton, Ohio.  The station is known as "Joy 1520," and features an Urban Gospel radio format. WINW is daytimer station, transmitting with 1,000 watts using a directional antenna with a four-tower array; but because AM 1520 is a clear channel frequency reserved for Class A WWKB Buffalo, New York and KOKC Oklahoma City, WINW must sign-off at sunset to avoid interference.  The transmitter is in Martindale Park in Canton, near Martindale Road NE.

History

Top 40 Era
WINW established a solid reputation as a Top 40 station in the 1960s and 1970s, using the slogan "WIN-Wonderful."  Even as a daytime station with a highly directional 1,000-watt signal, it was successful in Canton for over a decade, sometimes approaching double digits in the ratings, despite its obvious signal limitations.

WINW had shared its frequency with WJMP located in nearby Kent, which made the Canton station difficult to hear in Northern Stark County. The station was originally built and run by Joseph Patterson "Patt" Wardlaw, Jr., who owned radio station KIST 1340 in Santa Barbara, California, and who had previously owned and operated WLEU in Erie, Pennsylvania. New AM Top 40 competition in the form of WQIO (Q-10) (now WILB) in late 1976, as well as the increasing popularity of FM radio stations, eventually brought an end to the glory years of "WIN-Wonderful."

Adult Standards
WINW purchased FM station WHLQ (106.9) from Susquehanna Radio Corporation in 1978, changing its call sign to WOOS-FM, and installed an automated Top 40 format there, while WINW changed to an Adult Standards format in 1981 and then went through a string of format and call letter changes for the next 15 years.

WINW evolved into an adult contemporary station by the mid-1980s, became an automated oldies station in 1987, changed to album rock WRQK (AM) on February 14, 1989 when it was coupled with WRQK-FM, changed back to WINW on August 16, 1989, then changed once again to WPGY on April 5, 1996 (by that time owned by Sabre Communications, which was "parking" the WPGY call letters for use on its new FM in Elmira, New York), and finally changed back to WINW on March 27, 1997.

Urban Gospel
The 1997 version of WINW was originally a Contemporary Christian station, but leased an increasing amount of its air time to preachers while playing Urban Gospel music.  Eventually the station decided to go full time with urban gospel.

After many years using studios near its transmitter site on Martindale Road, N.E., WINW moved into new studios at 237 West Tuscarawas Street in downtown Canton not long after the format change to Gospel.  The "WIN-Wonderful" sign from the station's Top 40 heyday remained standing outside the Martindale studio building until the mid-1990s.

Transmitter Vandalism
On September 23, 2010, WINW's transmitter site was heavily vandalized - the victim of copper theft during the station's off-hours in the nighttime. Due to that and severed tower support cables, WINW was forced off the air for an extended period. Pinebrook Corp. also realized that a 2004 license renewal was dismissed and the station no longer had authority to operate. It returned to the air with a temporary wire antenna, but would eventually fall silent again on February 23, 2011.

The FCC deleted WINW's license from the records on March 3, 2011. However, on September 15, 2011, the FCC granted special temporary authority (STA) for WINW to resume operations, following a request by Pinebrook Corp., which claimed that repairs to the station's facilities were completed. The station returned to the air in December 2011.

References

External links
 WINW weekly music survey ("WIN-Wonderlist") from January 17, 1970
 WINW weekly music survey ("WIN-Wonderlist") from February 20, 1971
 Aircheck of WINW from May 1986 (also featuring an old WINW logo from the 1960s or 1970s)

INW
Radio stations established in 1966
Culture of Canton, Ohio
1966 establishments in Ohio
INW